"Nessuno" (literally "Nobody") is a 1959 Italian song composed by Antonietta De Simone and Edilio Capotosti.  The song  premiered at the ninth edition of the Sanremo Music Festival, with a double performance by Wilma De Angelis and Betty Curtis, and placed at the eighth place.

Ignored by the public in its original versions, the song got a large commercial success thanks to the  rock'n'roll version recorded by Mina.   Mina's version was performed in fortissimo and in a syncopated style, distorting the linearity of the original melody.  This version of the song premiered at the Festival of Rock and Roll held at the Milan Ice Palace. Mina's "Nessuno" was released as a "double A-side" together with another song from the Sanremo Festival, "Tua", which had been originally performed by  Jula De Palma and Tonina Torrielli.

The song was later covered by numerous artists, including Johnny Dorelli, Nilla Pizzi, Jula De Palma, Tony Dallara, Fiorello, Nico Fidenco, Miranda Martino.

Track listing
   7" single –  MH-23 
 "Tua"  (Bruno Pallesi, Walter Malgoni)   
 "Nessuno"  (Antonietta De Simone, Edilio Capotosti)

References

 

1959 singles
Italian songs
1959 songs
Sanremo Music Festival songs
Mina (Italian singer) songs